Richard W. Johnston (June 11, 1919 – November 6, 2008), was a Canadian sports journalist. A columnist for The Buffalo News, he won the Elmer Ferguson Memorial Award in 1986 and is a member of the media section of the Hockey Hall of Fame. He joined the paper in 1939 and retired in 1984.

References

1919 births
2008 deaths
Canadian sports journalists
Cornell University alumni
Elmer Ferguson Award winners